Platyptilia aarviki is a moth of the family Pterophoroidea. It is found in Kenya. The species is named after Leif Aarvik, in honour of his thorough work on the Microlepidoptera of Tanzania.

The wingspan is about 33 mm. The moth flies in November.

References

External links 
 Ten new species of Afrotropical Pterophoridae (Lepidoptera)

aarviki
Endemic moths of Kenya
Moths described in 2008
Moths of Africa
Taxa named by Cees Gielis